Souleymane M'baye (born March 21, 1975) is a French professional boxer and is the former WBA super-lightweight champion. He won the vacated title by a fourth technical knockout on September 2, 2006 against Raul Horacio Balbi. His defeats came against former WBA super-lightweight champion Vivian Harris, former WBA light-welterweight champion Gavin Rees, and Herman Ngoudjo. On May 28, M'baye defeated Antonin Décarie by unanimous decision to capture the WBA Interim welterweight title.

See also
 List of WBA world champions

External links
 

1975 births
Living people
World Boxing Association champions
World light-welterweight boxing champions
French male boxers